"Paradise" is a song by Italian DJ Benny Benassi and American singer Chris Brown, released on 31 March 2016. It was released as a promotional single on August 20, 2015.

Background
The song was written by Benassi, Brown, Daniel Daley, Alle Benassi and Stephen Kozmeniuk. Brown and Benassi had worked together for the first time on the song "Beautiful People" in 2010, and subsequently Benassi had produced another track for Brown, "Don't Wake Me Up", in 2012. After these collaborations Brown said in an interview for Billboard: "Benny and I have a history of making special music for the fans worldwide, and "Paradise" is another collaboration that I believe the fans will love and embrace".

In August 2015 Benassi has premiered a demo called "Paradise" on his SoundCloud page and removed it later. In March 2016 Brown had posted on his Instagram profile photos showing him and Benassi on the set for the video. After that Benassi has released the song on 31 March 2016.

Music video
On 7 April 2016 Ultra Music uploaded the music video for "Paradise" on his YouTube account.

Track listing

Charts

Weekly charts

Year-end charts

Certifications

References

2016 singles
2016 songs
Chris Brown songs
Benny Benassi songs
Electronic songs
Songs written by Chris Brown
Songs written by Benny Benassi
Songs written by Alle Benassi
Songs written by Stephen Kozmeniuk
Song recordings produced by Benny Benassi
Song recordings produced by Alle Benassi
Ultra Music singles